Power Dynamos is a Zambian football club based in Kitwe that plays in the MTN/FAZ Super Division. They play their home games at Arthur Davies Stadium in Kitwe. 

The club is currently sponsored by Copperbelt Energy Corporation.

Power Dynamos is known for playing beautiful passing football and their matches are usually enjoyed by the Zambian Premier League fans. Their main rivals are Nkana FC and Zesco United FC. Games involving Power Dynamos and any of these two clubs are always highly attended by the soccer fans.

In 1991, Power Dynamos became the first southern African club to win a continental trophy after they won the African Cup Winners' Cup.

Honours

National
Zambian Premier League: 6
1984, 1991, 1994, 1997, 2000, 2011

Zambian Cup: 7
1979, 1980, 1982, 1990, 1997, 2001, 2003
Finalist : 2002

ABSA Cup: 2
2009, 2011
Finalist : 2008, 2012

Zambian Charity Shield: 6
1998, 2004, 2009, 2012, 2013, 2016

Zambian Challenge Cup: 2
1990, 2001

Zambian Coca-Cola Cup: 1
2003

Zambian Barclays Cup: 2
2009, 2011

International
African Cup Winners' Cup: 1
*Champions 1991

*Finalists 1982

*Quarter finalists 1981, 1983, 1988, 1999 & 2002

*Second Round 1989, 1994, 2015

*First Round 2013
 Rothmans International Cup:1                                     *Champions 1983
CAF Champions League                                    *Quarter finalists 1985                                      *Second Round 1998, 2001 & 2012                          *First Round 1995

Performance in CAF competitions
CAF Champions League: 3 appearances
1998 – Second Round
2001 – First Round
2012 – Second Round

 African Cup of Champions Clubs: 2 appearances
1985 – Second Round
1995 – First Round

CAF Cup Winners' Cup: 10 appearances

1981 – Quarter-finals
1982 – Finalist
1986 – Quarter-finals
1988 – Second Round

1989 – Second Round
1991 – Champion
1992 – Second Round
1994 – First Round

1999 – Quarter-finals
2003 – Quarter-finals

Squad

Coaches
 Fred Mwila Sr (Coach)
 Ben Bamfuchile (Coach) (late)
 Aggrey Chiyangi (Coach)
 Jones Mwewa (Assistant) (late)
 Fordson Kabole (Coach)
 Alex Chola (Coach) (late) (1985–90), (1992–93)
 Jimmy Bone (Coach) (1988-91)
 Gaston Mutobo (Coach) (1999-2000)
 Mohamed Fathy (Coach) (2009)
 Tenant Chilumba (Coach) (2014–16)
 Dan Kabwe (Coach) (2016–18)
 Kelvin Kaindu (Coach) (2018–19)
 Fordson Kabole (Coach) (2019)
 Gaston Mutobo (Coach) (2019)
 Perry Mutapa (Coach) (2020-2021
 Masautso Phiri
 Mwenya Chipepo (present)

References

External links
Official website

Football clubs in Zambia
Association football clubs established in 1971
1971 establishments in Zambia
Kitwe
African Cup Winners Cup winning clubs